Alaa Abbas Abdulnabi Al-Farttoosi (born 27 July 1997) is an Iraqi footballer who plays as a striker for Al-Zawraa in the Iraqi Premier League.

Career
Abbas was included in Iraq's squad for the 2019 AFC Asian Cup in the United Arab Emirates. On 24 December 2018, Abbas won his first international cap with Iraq against China in a friendly match.

He played only one season with Kuwait SC in the Kuwait Premier League and has directly aroused the interest of several European clubs especially for his performances with the Iraqi national team. On 6 December 2020, the Portuguese club Gil Vicente officialized the arrival of striker Alaa Abbas for a three-year contract to strengthen the team's offensive in Liga NOS. The number 10 has been granted to him.

Alaa Abbas' agent Aimar Risan stated on Iraqi national television that the contract with Gil Vicente includes a release clause of 25 million euros.

Career statistics

International

International goals
Scores and results list Iraq's goal tally first.

Honours

Club
Al-Zawraa
Iraq FA Cup: 2018–19
Al-Kuwait
Kuwaiti Premier League: 2019–20
Kuwait Crown Prince Cup: 2019–20

International
Iraq
 Arabian Gulf Cup: 2023

Individual
Iraq FA Cup top scorer: 2018–19
Soccer Iraq Goal of the Season: 2021–22

References

External links
 
 
 

1997 births
Living people
Iraqi footballers
Iraq international footballers
Association football forwards
Naft Al-Wasat SC players
Al-Zawraa SC players
2019 AFC Asian Cup players
Sportspeople from Baghdad
Kuwait SC players
Kuwait Premier League players
Iraqi expatriate sportspeople in Kuwait
Iraqi expatriate footballers
Expatriate footballers in Kuwait
Gil Vicente F.C. players
Primeira Liga players
Expatriate footballers in Portugal
Iraqi expatriate sportspeople in Portugal
Iraqi Premier League players